Kate Charbonneau (born April 2, 1993) is a Canadian former competitive figure skater. She is the 2009 Canadian national junior champion and placed sixth at the 2010 World Junior Championships.

Personal life 
Charbonneau was born on April 2, 1993 in Winnipeg, Manitoba. She has lived in Prior Lake, Minnesota with her family since she was four. Her mother, Lorie, is a figure skating coach.

Career 
Charbonneau began skating at age three because her dying grandmother wanted to see her skate before she died. She started skating competitively in the United States but never appeared internationally for the U.S. She placed fourth on the intermediate level at the 2006 U.S. Junior Championships but the next two seasons she did not advance from Regionals and Sectionals. In the 2008–09 season, she began representing Canada as she had wanted to skate for Canada since she was about seven years old.

Charbonneau won the junior ladies' title at the 2009 Canadian Championships and received her first ISU Junior Grand Prix assignments later that year. She placed seventh on the senior level at the 2010 Canadian Championships. In March 2010, she represented Canada at the 2010 World Junior Championships in The Hague, Netherlands; she placed fourth in the short program, seventh in the free skate, and sixth overall.

Charbonneau was coached by her mother, Lorie, and Robert Tebby in Bloomington, Minnesota. After retiring from competition, she began a coaching career. She is an instructor in learn-to-skate programs.

Programs

Competitive highlights 
JGP: Junior Grand Prix

Results for Canada

Results for the United States

References

External links 

 

1993 births
Living people
Canadian female single skaters
People from Prior Lake, Minnesota
Sportspeople from Winnipeg